Zaur Zalimbiyevich Khapov (born 21 October 1964) is a Russian football coach and a former goalkeeper who won two international caps for Russia in 1994. He is the assistant manager of FC Lokomotiv Moscow.

Club career
He was Alania Vladikavkaz's goalkeeper during their Russian league title-winning season of 1995.

International career
Khapov played his first game for Russia on 29 January 1994 in a 1–1 draw in a friendly against the United States in Seattle. He also played in another friendly against Mexico in Oakland four days later, which Russia won 4–1.

Managing career
On 4 April 2022, he was appointed manager of FC Lokomotiv Moscow. As Lokomotiv's sporting director Thomas Zorn commented at the time, Khapov was appointed as he possesses the necessary UEFA A Licence and most of the manager duties will continue to be performed by Marvin Compper who does not have such a licence and therefore can not be formally registered with the league as a manager. On 30 June 2022, Josef Zinnbauer was appointed head coach of Lokomotiv, with Khapov continuing to work at the club.

Honours
 Umaglesi Liga winner: 1990.
 Russian Premier League winner: 1995.
 Russian Cup winner: 2001.
 Top 33 players year-end list: 1993, 1994, 1995.

References

External links
  Profile

1964 births
Living people
Sportspeople from Nalchik
Soviet footballers
Ossetian people
Russian footballers
Russia international footballers
Soviet Top League players
FC SKA Rostov-on-Don players
FC Spartak Moscow players
FC Shinnik Yaroslavl players
FC Dinamo Tbilisi players
FC Spartak Vladikavkaz players
FC Lokomotiv Moscow players
PFC Spartak Nalchik players
Russian Premier League players
Erovnuli Liga players
Association football goalkeepers
Russian football managers
FC Lokomotiv Moscow managers
Russian Premier League managers